"God Must Be a Cowboy" is a song written and recorded by American country music artist Dan Seals. It was released in January 1984 as the fourth and final single from his album Rebel Heart. It was also his first top 10 hit, reaching #10. It is also the album's most successful single.

Music video
The music video, directed by Neil Abramson, is one of three videos Seals filmed specially for his 1991 video compilation, A Portrait. The video shows Seals singing the song in the middle of a highway in a desert and also shows footage and photographs of a mix of ranches and cowboys in their typical lifestyle.

Chart positions

References

1984 singles
Dan Seals songs
Songs written by Dan Seals
Song recordings produced by Kyle Lehning
Liberty Records singles
1983 songs